The 2003 Cronulla-Sutherland Sharks season was the 37th in the club's history. Coached by Chris Anderson and captained by David Peachey and Brett Kimmorley, they competed in the NRL's 2003 Telstra Premiership. The Sharks finished the regular season 12th (out of 15), failing to make the play-offs for the first time since 1998.

Season summary
Cronulla, hoping to build on its past four seasons in which it made the finals, suffered a season of unrelenting disappointment which culminated in the dismissal of head coach Chris Anderson.

The Sharks' 2003 season lowlight was the 74-4 thumping received at the hands of the Parramatta Eels at Parramatta Stadium on 23 August 2003 (round 24). Despite scoring first through Paul Gallen in the 18th minute, and only trailing 24–4 at halftime, the Sharks put in their worst ever performance which just got worse with captain David Peachey and Dale Newton taking the walk of shame and Danny Nutley being sin binned for pulling the leg of a Parramatta opponent. It would not be until Round 11, 2011 that the Sharks would again leave Parramatta Stadium on the back of a hiding; but this time the Sharks had a 40–6 defeat.

Highlights were few and far between in 2003; notable wins included a big 40–16 win over Manly in what was their first win for the season (also a big one) backed up with a 30–14 win over the South Sydney Rabbitohs, both at home and then a 30–24 away win over the 2001 premiers Newcastle in Newcastle in which Paul Gallen was sent off. It appeared as though those hat-trick of wins would get the Sharks going in 2003, but the Sharks were never in the finals hunt throughout the year. Other notable wins included a 34–28 win over the North Queensland Cowboys in Townsville, a comeback 20–10 win over the Brisbane Broncos after trailing 10–2 at halftime, a 25–16 win over bitter rivals St. George Illawarra at home and then a 54–34 win over the Rabbitohs in a bottom-of-the-table clash (this match occurring the week after the humiliating defeat against Parramatta).

Anderson was replaced during the off-season by Stuart Raper who had previous coaching experience with the Wigan Warriors. His term at the Sharks would only last three full seasons.

Ladder

References

Cronulla-Sutherland Sharks seasons
Cronulla-Sutherland Sharks season